Szklarska Poręba  is a town in Jelenia Góra County, Lower Silesian Voivodeship, in south-western Poland. The town has a population of around 6,500. It is a popular ski resort.

The ski resorts in this area are growing in popularity as a budget alternative to the Alps, thanks to wide range of both Alpine and Nordic skiing facilities.

History 

The land on which the village was founded was bought in the 13th century from Duke Bernard the Lightsome by the Knights Hospitaller descending from Calidus Fons (now Cieplice Śląskie-Zdrój in Jelenia Góra), who were interested in finding gold and precious gems in the area. It was part of the duchies of Lwówek and Jawor, the southwesternmost duchies of fragmented Piast-ruled Poland. The village was established, as part of the Duchy of Jawor, by German colonists. It was first mentioned in 1366 and 1372 in conjunction with a glass factory, forerunner of the famed later Josephinenhütte, as Schribirshau and Schreibershow.

In 1578 several Czech Protestants moved to the village and greatly contributed to its development. Among the refugees was Marie Pluch, which gave the district Marysin its name. Experts on herbal medicine, who collected medicinal plants and produced famous herbal medicines, have made their mark in the history of the region. Over time the glass factory moved deeper into the mountains. In 1617 the Preußler family migrated from the southern, Bohemian side of the Karkonosze ridge to Silesia and received a concession to run a movable glass factory from the counts of Schaffgotsch, landlords of Schreiberhau. The glass industry of the village was dominated by the Preußler family for the next 200 years. In 1842 Franz Pohl, son-in-law of the last Preußler, persuaded Count Schaffgotsch to establish a new glass factory in Schreiberhau. This Josephinenhütte became the largest and best glass factory in Silesia, while Schreiberhau greatly expanded to become the largest village in Prussia, which annexed the region in 1742, with 15 districts covering .

Around 1900 several artists discovered the beauty of the countryside and formed the Schreiberhau artists' colony, among them Gerhart Hauptmann and his brother Carl, Otto Mueller, Wilhelm Bölsche, and composer Anna Teichmüller. In 1911,  founded the Silesian Artistic Weaving Workshop with an exhibition gallery, which existed until 1919. Later, younger artists formed the St. Lukas artists' association. In 1925 the first winter games of the International Workers Olympiad (organised by the Socialist Workers' Sport International) were held in the town. Twelve national delegations participated.

During World War II the Reich Labour Service (RAD) ran two Nazi German labor camps, RAD-Abteilung 6/103 and RAD-Abteilung 6/107, in the settlement.

After the defeat of Nazi Germany in World War II Schreiberhau became part of Poland under the territorial changes of Poland after World War II and was given the name Szklarska Poręba which literally means "glass clearing". In accordance to the Potsdam Agreement, the German inhabitants were expelled and the village was resettled with Poles, many of whom were themselves expelled from former eastern Poland annexed by the Soviet Union. The Josephinenhütte was moved to Schwäbisch Gmünd. The glass factory in Szklarska Poręba was renamed and continued to operate. On 22–27 September 1947 the conference on the establishment of the communist information office (Kominform) took place in the village. The village gained the status of a town in 1959.

Transport

The town used to be connected via the Zackenbahn railway to Tanvald in Bohemia. The cross-border passenger line was closed in 1945 when the town was given to Poland and remained closed until 2010. In 2010 the cross-border railway connection was reconstructed and is now operated by passenger trains from Kořenov. The railway connection to Jelenia Góra plays a minor role, since the scale of the mining industry in the town's vicinity has decreased. Koleje Dolnośląskie D21 line runs from Szklarska Poręba Górna to Liberec.

A section of national road no. 3, also part of European route E65, passes through the town.

Sports
FIS Cross-Country World Cup events were held in Szklarska Poręba in 2012 and 2014. The Bieg Piastów cross-country skiing marathon is held in the town since 1976.

Notable people

 Joseph Partsch (1851–1925), German geographer
 Max Standfuss (1854–1917), Swiss scientist
 Wlastimil Hofman (1881–1970), Czech-Polish painter
 Mirosław Graf (born 1959), Polish former ski jumper and mayor of Szklarska Poręba

Twin towns – sister cities

Szklarska Poręba is twinned with:

 Bad Harzburg, Germany
 Harrachov, Czech Republic
 Kazimierz Dolny, Poland
 Kořenov, Czech Republic
 Worpswede, Germany

Gallery

References

Bibliography

External links

 Skiing in Szklarska Poręba
 Municipal website
 
 www.szklarska-poreba.pl Szklarska Poręba - gallery, news, map
 Szklarska Poreba Apartments

Cities and towns in Lower Silesian Voivodeship
Karkonosze County
Ski areas and resorts in Poland
14th-century establishments in Poland